Marian Suski (2 November 1905 – 25 December 1993) was a Polish fencer and engineer. He won a bronze medal in the team sabre event at the 1932 Summer Olympics. He served in the Polish Army and commanded the communication during the defense of Warsaw in 1939. After capitulation he was sent to oflag and eventually to Oflag VII-A Murnau.

References

1905 births
1993 deaths
Sportspeople from Kielce
People from Kielce Governorate
Fencers at the 1932 Summer Olympics
Fencers at the 1936 Summer Olympics
Medalists at the 1932 Summer Olympics
Olympic bronze medalists for Poland
Olympic fencers of Poland
Olympic medalists in fencing
Polish male fencers
Polish military personnel of World War II
Polish prisoners of war
20th-century Polish people